The Registration Data Access Protocol (RDAP) is a computer network communications protocol standardized by a working group at the Internet Engineering Task Force in 2015, after experimental developments and thorough discussions.  It is a successor to the WHOIS protocol, used to look up relevant registration data from such Internet resources as domain names, IP addresses, and autonomous system numbers.

While WHOIS essentially retrieves free text, RDAP delivers data in a standard, machine-readable JSON format.  In order to accomplish this goal, the output of all operative WHOIS servers was analyzed, taking a census of the labels they used.  RDAP designers, many of whom are members of number or name  registries, strove to keep the protocol as simple as possible, since complexity was considered one of the reasons why previous attempts, such as CRISP, failed.  RDAP is based on RESTful web services, so that error codes,  user identification, authentication, and access control can be delivered through HTTP.

The biggest delay in getting RDAP done turned out to be the bootstrap, figuring out where the server is for each top level domain, IP range, or ASN range.  IANA agreed to host the bootstrap information in suitable registries, and publish it at a well-known location URLs in JSON format. Those registries started  empty and will be gradually populated as registrants of domains and address spaces provide RDAP server information to IANA.  For number registries, ARIN set up a public RDAP service which also features a bootstrap URL, similar to what they do for WHOIS.  For name registries, ICANN requires RDAP compliance since 2013.

Examples
An example of a RDAP client and server exchange:

     Client:
         <TCP connect to rdap.example.com port 80>
         GET /rdap/ip/203.0.113.0/24 HTTP/1.1
         Host: rdap.example.com
         Accept: application/rdap+json

     rdap.example.com:
         HTTP/1.1 301 Moved Permanently
         Location: http://rdap-ip.example.com/rdap/ip/203.0.113.0/24
         Content-Length: 0
         Content-Type: application/rdap+json
         <TCP disconnect>

     Client:
         <TCP connect to rdap-ip.example.com port 80>
         GET /rdap/ip/203.0.113.0/24 HTTP/1.1
         Host:  rdap-ip.example.com
         Accept: application/rdap+json

     rdap-ip.example.com:
         HTTP/1.1 200 OK
         Content-Type: application/rdap+json
         Content-Length: 9001

         { ... }
         <TCP disconnect>

Number resources
RDAP databases for assigned IP numbers are maintained by five Regional Internet registries.  ARIN maintains a bootstrap database.  Thanks to the standard document format, tasks such as, for example, getting the abuse team address of a given IP number can be accomplished in a fully automated manner.

Name resources
RDAP databases for registered names are maintained after ICANN agreement.  Name resources are much slower, as the number of registries under ICANN is huge.  In addition, as the GDPR became enforceable, in May 2018, the problem of personal data divulged via WHOIS or RDAP slowed adoption further.

References

External links 
 IANA registry for RDAP services
  - A command line Registry Data Access Protocol (RDAP) client
 rdap.org - An end point for RDAP queries
 RDAP JSON Values at IANA
 RDAP page at APNIC
 RDAP page at ARIN
 RDAP page at LACNIC
 
 

Internet protocols
Internet Standards